The 2015 Kelly Cup Playoffs of the ECHL started April 14, 2015 following the conclusion of the 2014–15 ECHL regular season.

Playoff format
At the end of the regular season the top four teams in each division qualified for the 2015 Kelly Cup Playoffs. The first two playoff rounds are played entirely within the divisions, with the divisional playoff champions facing each other in the conference championships. The Kelly Cup final pits the Eastern Conference champion against the Western Conference champion. All four rounds are a best-of-seven format.

Playoff seeds
After the regular season, 16 teams qualified for the playoffs. The Toledo Walleye were the Brabham Cup winners with the best record, winning their first regular season title since the 2002-03 season, when they were known as the Storm.

Eastern Conference

North Division
 Toledo Walleye
 Fort Wayne Komets
 Kalamazoo Wings
 Wheeling Nailers

East Division
 Florida Everblades
 South Carolina Stingrays
 Reading Royals
 Orlando Solar Bears

Western Conference

Central Division
 Allen Americans
 Rapid City Rush
 Quad City Mallards
 Tulsa Oilers

Pacific Division
 Idaho Steelheads
 Ontario Reign
 Colorado Eagles
 Utah Grizzlies

Playoff Brackets

Division Semifinals 
Home team is listed first.

North Division

(1) Toledo Walleye vs. (4) Wheeling Nailers

(2) Fort Wayne Komets vs. (3) Kalamazoo Wings

East Division

(1) Florida Everblades vs. (4) Orlando Solar Bears

(2) South Carolina Stingrays vs. (3) Reading Royals

Central Division

(1) Allen Americans vs. (4) Tulsa Oilers

(2) Rapid City Rush vs. (3) Quad City Mallards

Pacific Division

(1) Idaho Steelheads vs. (4) Utah Grizzlies

(2) Ontario Reign vs. (3) Colorado Eagles

Division Finals 
Home team is listed first.

North Division

(1) Toledo Walleye vs. (2) Fort Wayne Komets

East Division

(1) Florida Everblades vs. (2) South Carolina Stingrays

Central Division

(1) Allen Americans vs. (2) Rapid City Rush

Pacific Division

(2) Ontario Reign vs. (4) Utah Grizzlies

Conference Finals
Home team is listed first.

Eastern Conference

(North #1) Toledo Walleye vs. (East #2) South Carolina Stingrays

Western Conference

(Central #1) Allen Americans vs. (Pacific #2) Ontario Reign

Kelly Cup Finals 
Home team is listed first.

(Central #1) Allen Americans vs. (East #2) South Carolina Stingrays

Statistical leaders

Skaters
These are the top ten skaters based on points.

GP = Games played; G = Goals; A = Assists; Pts = Points; +/– = Plus/minus; PIM = Penalty minutes

Goaltending

This is a combined table of the top five goaltenders based on goals against average and the top five goaltenders based on save percentage, with at least 240 minutes played. The table is sorted by GAA, and the criteria for inclusion are bolded.

GP = Games played; W = Wins; L = Losses; OTL = Overtime Losses; SA = Shots against; GA = Goals against; GAA = Goals against average; SV% = Save percentage; SO = Shutouts; TOI = Time on ice (in minutes)

References

See also 
 2014–15 ECHL season
 List of ECHL seasons

Kelly Cup playoffs
2014–15 ECHL season